Tanya Thornton Shewell (born March 9, 1944) is an American politician and former member of the Maryland House of Delegates.

Background
Tanya Shewell replaced Carmen Amedori when she was appointed to the Parole Commission by Governor Bob Ehrlich in 2004.  In 2007, she became the Deputy Minority Whip in the Maryland House of Delegates.  Shewell represents District 5A, which covers Carroll County, MD.

Personal life
Tanya Shewell attended Troy High School in Troy, OH and graduated as valedictorian.  She graduated in 1970 from Towson State University, summa cum laude, with a B.S. in psychology and sociology. She is married with two children.

Career
Tanya Shewell is the manager/owner of a family rental property business, Shewell Enterprises, since 1969.  She worked for the State Department of Education at the Division of Vocational Rehabilitation from 1970 to 1977, and the Carroll Lutheran Health Care Center from 1981 to 1983. In addition, she was the Executive Director of Granite House Inc. from 1983 to 1991.

Legislative Notes
 voted against in-state tuition for illegal immigrants in 2007 (HB6)

Election results

2006 Race for Maryland House of Delegates – District 5A
Voters to choose two:
{| class="wikitable"
|-
!Name
!Votes
!Percent
!Outcome
|-
|- 
|Tanya Thornton Shewell, Rep.
|18,785
|  32.9%
|   Won
|-
|-
|Nancy R. Stocksdale, Rep.
|20,630
|  36.1%
|   Won
|-
|-
|Ann Darrin, Dem.
|9,489
|  16.6%
|   Lost
|-
|-
|Frank Henry Rammes, Dem.
|8,192
|  14.3%
|   Lost
|-
|Other Write-Ins
|57
|  0.1%
|   Lost
|}

References

http://www.msa.md.gov/msa/mdmanual/06hse/html/msa14319.html

Towson University alumni
1944 births
People from Piqua, Ohio
Living people
People from Carroll County, Maryland
Women state legislators in Maryland
Republican Party members of the Maryland House of Delegates
21st-century American politicians
21st-century American women politicians